David Dennis Lough (born January 20, 1986) is an American former professional baseball outfielder. He played in Major League Baseball (MLB) for the Kansas City Royals, Baltimore Orioles and Philadelphia Phillies. While primarily used in left field throughout his career, Lough played in all outfield positions.

Baseball career

Amateur career
A graduate of Green High School, Lough attended Mercyhurst College and played college baseball and college football for the Mercyhurst Lakers in the National Collegiate Athletic Association's Division II. For the baseball team, Lough recorded batting averages of .409 and .404 in his sophomore and junior years. As a wide receiver for the football team, Lough had 16 receptions for 223 yards in his junior year.

Kansas City Royals
Lough was drafted by the Kansas City Royals in the 11th round of the 2007 Major League Baseball Draft. Lough made his major league debut September 1, 2012 against the Minnesota Twins. On June 11, 2013, Lough hit his first Major League home run off Detroit Tigers starter Max Scherzer. On June 30, 2013, Lough became only the fifth Royal to get four extra base hits in a game, joining George Brett, Hal McRae, Lonnie Smith and Johnny Damon. His strong play in 2013 (.286 AVG with 5 HR's and 33 RBI over 96 games) helped him finish 8th in American League Rookie of the Year voting.

Baltimore Orioles
On December 18, 2013, Lough was traded to the Baltimore Orioles in exchange for third baseman Danny Valencia. Lough played a late-inning utility role for the Orioles in 2014. On April 13, 2015, the Orioles activated Lough from the disabled list so he could join the team full-time for the 2015 season. On April 25, 2015, in the tenth inning of a game against the Boston Red Sox, Lough hit a two-run walk off home run off of closer Koji Uehara to win the game 5-4.  Lough was designated for assignment by the Orioles on August 14, 2015 and called back up in September.

Philadelphia Phillies
On April 18, 2016, Lough had his contract purchased from Triple-A by the Philadelphia Phillies making his Phillies' debut that evening. On June 2, Lough was designated for assignment.

Detroit Tigers
On February 7, 2017, Lough signed a minor league contract with the Detroit Tigers with a spring training invite.

Cleveland Indians
On May 23, 2017, Lough signed a minor league deal with the Cleveland Indians organization.  He elected free agency on November 6, 2017.

Personal life
Lough resides in his home town of Green, Ohio.

References

External links

1986 births
Living people
Baseball players from Akron, Ohio
Major League Baseball outfielders
Kansas City Royals players
Baltimore Orioles players
Philadelphia Phillies players
Mercyhurst Lakers baseball players
Mercyhurst Lakers football players
Burlington Bees players
Wilmington Blue Rocks players
Northwest Arkansas Naturals players
Omaha Royals players
Omaha Storm Chasers players
Águilas Cibaeñas players
American expatriate baseball players in the Dominican Republic
Frederick Keys players
Lehigh Valley IronPigs players
New Orleans Zephyrs players
Toledo Mud Hens players
Columbus Clippers players